Bahrain competed at the 1992 Summer Paralympics in Barcelona, Spain. 4 competitors from Bahrain won a single bronze medal and finished 50th in the medal table along with five other countries.

See also 
 Bahrain at the Paralympics
 Bahrain at the 1992 Summer Olympics

References 

Bahrain at the Paralympics
Nations at the 1992 Summer Paralympics
1992 in Bahraini sport